Schulman is a surname, usually that of a Jewish or a German person. Some well-known people with this name are:
 Alex Schulman, Swedish journalist, blogger, radio and television personality
 Allan Schulman, Swedish journalist and television producer
 Ari Schulman, American journalist and editor of The New Atlantis
 Arnold Schulman, American writer
 Dan Schulman (born 1958), American businessman, CEO of PayPal
 Daniel Schulman (disambiguation), several people
 Dennis Schulman, Rabbi, democratic congressional candidate for NJ 5th district
 Frank Schulman, Unitarian Universalist minister, theologian, and author 
 Kalman Schulman, Lithuanian writer and translator 
 Mark Schulman, Canadian chess master
 J. Neil Schulman, American author, journalist, and filmmaker
 Lawrence Schulman, music producer, critic, and translator
 Leonard Schulman, professor of computer science
 Roger S. H. Schulman, American film and television screenwriter and producer
 Sarah Schulman, writer and activist
 Schulman family, a Baltic German and Swedish noble family now mainly found in Finland and Canada
 Susan H. Schulman, American theatre director
 Scott Schulman, American technology and security expert

See also
 Shulman
 Schulmann

German-language surnames
Jewish surnames
Yiddish-language surnames